Hierotheos Vlachos (born Georgios Vlachos, 1945) is a Greek Orthodox metropolitan and theologian.

Biography
He was born in 1945 in Ioannina, Greece. He graduated from the Theological School of the University of Thessaloniki and was ordained priest in 1972 and bishop in 1995. His diocese is the Metropolis of Nafpaktos and Agios Vlasios.

His book The Person in the Orthodox Tradition was awarded the first prize for the "top theological work written in Greece in 1991–96" by the Academy of Athens.

Bibliography

References 

Living people
Greek theologians
20th-century Eastern Orthodox bishops
21st-century Eastern Orthodox bishops
Eastern Orthodox theologians
People from Ioannina
Bishops of Nafpaktos
1945 births
Aristotle University of Thessaloniki alumni